Geita Lighthouse is a coastal lighthouse located in Askvoll Municipality in Vestland county, Norway. It was first lit in 1897 and it was automated from 1980–1982. It was listed as a protected site in 1999.

The red tower is attached to a white lighthouse. The building is available for vacation rental during the summer and is leased to artists at other times. The site is accessible only by boat.

See also

 List of lighthouses in Norway
 Lighthouses in Norway

References

External links
 Norsk Fyrhistorisk Forening 

Lighthouses completed in 1897
Lighthouses in Vestland
Listed lighthouses in Norway
Askvoll